Warren Bondo (born 15 September 2003) is a French professional footballer who plays as a midfielder for  club Reggina, on loan from Monza.

Club career

Early life and Nancy
Born in Évry, France, Bondo began playing football at VESC 91, aged four. He then played for Corbeil-Essonnes, Viry-Châtillon and Brétigny, before being scouted by Nancy, whom he joined in 2018.

In August 2019, Bondo signed his first professional contract with the club, thus becoming Nancy's youngest player ever to do so. He made his professional debut on 24 November 2020, coming in as a substitute for Dorian Bertrand in the 73rd minute of a 1–0 Ligue 2 defeat against Grenoble; however, he was sent off 14 minutes later. On 22 December of the same year, the midfielder scored his first professional goal, as he opened the score of a league match against Chambly, which ultimately ended in a 3-3 draw.

On 10 June 2022, Bondo announced his departure from Nancy, after deciding not to extend his contract, following the club's relegation to Championnat National.

Monza
On 28 July 2022, Bondo joined newly-promoted Serie A side Monza on a free transfer, signing a three-year contract in the process. He then made his Serie A debut on 30 August, coming in as a substitute for Stefano Sensi at the 85th minute of a 3–0 away defeat to Roma.

Loan to Reggina
On 31 January 2023, Bondo was sent on a six-month loan to Serie B club Reggina.

International career
Born in France, Bondo could also choose to represent DR Congo or Congo Republic internationally, due to his family's origins. He has represented his native country at several youth international levels.

In June 2022, Bondo was included in the France national under-19 team that took part in the UEFA European Under-19 Championship, where the Bleuets reached the semi-finals before losing to eventual runners-up Israel.

Personal life
Bondo's father is from DR Congo, while his mother is from Congo Republic.

Career statistics

Club

References

External links
 Profile at A.C. Monza 
 

2003 births
Living people
People from Évry, Essonne
Footballers from Essonne
French sportspeople of Republic of the Congo descent
French sportspeople of Democratic Republic of the Congo descent
Black French sportspeople
French footballers
France youth international footballers
Association football midfielders
AS Nancy Lorraine players
A.C. Monza players
Reggina 1914 players
Ligue 2 players
Championnat National 3 players
Serie A players
French expatriate footballers
Expatriate footballers in Italy
French expatriate sportspeople in Italy